Bar-lès-Buzancy (literally Bar near Buzancy) is a commune in the Ardennes department and Grand Est region of north-eastern France.

The commune has been awarded two flowers by the National Council of Towns and Villages in Bloom in the Competition of cities and villages in Bloom. (Their sign says three but the official website says two).

Geography

Bar-lès-Buzancy is located some 20 km east by north-east of Vouziers and 25 km west by south-west of Stenay. Access to the commune is by the D947 road from Buzancy in the south-east which passes through the south of the commune and the village and continues west to Harricourt. The D6 goes north from the D947 forming the western border of the commune and continuing north to Sommauthe. The commune is mostly farmland with some forest in the north.

The Ruisseau du Moulin rises in the north of the commune and forms part of the northern border before flowing south through the commune and the village and continuing south to join the Canal des Arches near Briquenay. La Hideuse stream forms the southern border of the commune as it flows south-west to join the Canal de Thenorgues.

Toponymy
Bar comes from a Gallic word and perhaps even older (pre-Gallic) meaning "summit" or "height".

History
Bar-lès-Buzancy appears as Bar on the 1750 Cassini Map and the same on the 1790 version.

From 1828-1871 the commune was merged with Harricourt to form the commune of Bar-et-Harricourt.
In October 1952 two Merovingian skeletons were discovered during the excavation phase of construction of a house.

Administration

List of mayors

Demography
In 2017 the commune had 125 inhabitants. The population data given in the table and graph below for the period 1831-1866 refer to the former commune of Bar-et-Harricourt.

See also
Communes of the Ardennes department

References

Communes of Ardennes (department)
Ardennes communes articles needing translation from French Wikipedia